Alisher Qudratov (born January 11, 1986, in Varzob) is an alpine skier from Tajikistan. Kudratov was Tajikistan's flag bearer during the 2010 Winter Olympics opening ceremony despite not being slated to compete in the Games themselves. He competed at the 2014 Winter Olympics in Sochi, Russia. He also carried the Tajik flag during the opening ceremony in Sochi.

References

External links

 FIS-Ski.com Biography/Results

1986 births
Living people
Tajikistani male alpine skiers
Olympic alpine skiers of Tajikistan
Alpine skiers at the 2014 Winter Olympics
Alpine skiers at the 2007 Asian Winter Games
Alpine skiers at the 2011 Asian Winter Games